Technical Career Institutes, also known as TCI College, was a private, for-profit college in New York City that offered two year associate degrees and certificates for education in technology, business, engineering, healthcare and other career paths. It was dually accredited from the New York State Board of Regents and by the Middle States Commission on Higher Education. TCI's curricula offered training at the associate degree level taught by more than 190 faculty.

History 
The school was founded in 1909 by Guglielmo Marconi as the Marconi Institute. By 1919 the school changed its name to RCA Institutes and then in 1974 it became Technical Career Institutes.

In 2009–2010 TCI had a 24% graduation rate and a 34.9% loan default rate, earning it the title from USA Today news as a "red flag school". It is not uncommon -profit colleges to have high rates of student loan default, which prompted a New York City Department of Consumer Affairs investigation in 2015.

On December 31, 2012, TCI was brought under the corporate control of EVCI Career Colleges Holding Corporation.

In May 2016, TCI named Dr. George Santiago, Jr. the president and CEO, he served until the schools closure in 2017.

A 2017 research study "Mobility Report Cards: The Role of Colleges in Intergenerational Mobility" done by Equality of Opportunity project on income mobility rates for low-income students named TCI the fourth top college in the United States for mobility. However additional research studies will need to be completed in order to better understand how and why some schools are performing better than others.

Closure 
TCI's website states "On September 1, 2017, TCI College closed its doors". According to the New York State Department of Labor, Worker Adjustment and Retraining Notification (WARN) submission the close was based on economic factors.

Notable people

Alumni 
 Martin A. Armstrong, creator of the Economic Confidence Model
 Iran Darroudi, artist, studied television direction and production.
 Ronny Lee, American guitarist and arranger.
 Prince (Omubiito) Solomon Michael Okwiri Adyeri Ishagara (son of Rukidi III of Toro), royalty in the Kingdom of Toro in Uganda.

Faculty 
 Rivka Bertisch Meir, 2005–2012 visiting professor of Health Sciences

References

External links 
 Video: TCI: The First Hundred Years on YouTube

Universities and colleges in New York City
Technological universities in the United States
Defunct private universities and colleges in New York City
1909 establishments in New York City
2017 disestablishments in New York (state)